2016–17 Hong Kong Sapling Cup (officially the 2016–17 R&F Properties Sapling Cup for sponsorship reasons) is the 2nd edition of the Sapling Cup. The Cup is contested by the 9 teams in the 2016–17 Hong Kong Premier League.

The objective of the Cup is to create more potential playing opportunities for youth players. In this Cup competition, each team must play a minimum of two players born on or after 1 January 1995 (U22) and six foreign players at most during every whole match, or send at most four foreign players during every whole match.

Tai Po won the title on 3 May 2017.

Calendar

Results

First round

Quarter-finals

Semi-finals

Final

External links
 Hong Kong Sapling Cup - Hong Kong Football Association

References

2016–17 domestic association football cups
Lea
Hong Kong Sapling Cup